Orez Shu'it (Ladino:  or ) is an Israeli dish consisting of white beans cooked in a tomato paste, served on white rice.
The dish was developed by Sephardic Jews in the old city of Jerusalem and was later adopted by other Jewish groups.
It is today served in homes and restaurants as a side dish, and is considered part of the regional cuisine of Jerusalem.
Modern variations include adding meat (beef, lamb, chicken) and fried onions.

See also
 Rice and beans
 Israeli cuisine
 Cuisine of the Sephardic Jews

References 

Rice dishes
Israeli cuisine
Sephardi Jewish cuisine
Legume dishes